Çarşı (spelled Tsharshi [like in bird] = the Market place), is geographically the old center of the municipality of Beşiktaş (beshiktash = the stone on the cradle) a part of central Istanbul, Turkey. The area is composed of a maze of tiny streets. The area of Çarşı is delimited as follow :

- south : Bosphorus straight

- west : Ortabahçe Caddesi (Middle Garden Av.) continuing as Ihlamur Caddesi (Linden Tea Av.)

- north : southern edge of Abbasağa Parkı (park of Abbasagha) known as Şehit Kazım sokak (street of the war martyr Kazım)

- east : Barbaros Caddesi (Barbaros Avenue)

Nay, the area is quite tiny but it is the very hearth of the municipality of Beşiktaş. The main activity of the area can be summarized so :

- food, such as döner kebab, hamsi (fresh anchovies fish) mostly served fried in oil with lemon juice or vinegar, kahveler (coffeehouses),  internet kafeler (internet cafés) open 7/7 24h/24 365 d/y, birahaneler (beer shops), çay bahçeleri [tshay bahtsheleree] (tea gardens), various garment and underwear shops, DVD / computer games / computers and accessories shops.

The streets of Çarşı are narrow, the center of Çarşı is a triangular place where only vegetables, fruits and fresh fishes are sold. Most of the fishes proposed on the market may find their final location in your plate whenever you decide to eat in one of the many fish restaurants surrounding the triangular square of Çarşı. With a lower budget, you may also find a multitude of self-service restaurants offering tasty and "popular" Turkish foods such as "ev yemekleri" (home cooking) even vegetarian food stores

Beşiktaş